Love and Dynamite (Swedish: Kärlek och dynamit) is a 1933 Swedish drama film directed by O.A.C. Lund and starring Valdemar Dalquist, Birgit Sergelius and Isa Quensel. It is now considered to be a lost film.

Synopsis
An engineer takes the daughter of Gustafsson, the owner of the shipbuilding yard he works at, on an unauthorised cruise and is fired by her father. Later he is able to rescue one of his ships that has run aground by using dynamite to shift it and Gustafsson becomes reconciled to him marrying his daughter.

Cast
 Steinar Jøranndstad as Ragge
 Valdemar Dalquist as 	Gustafsson
 Signe Lundberg-Settergren as 	Mrs. Gustafsson
 Birgit Sergelius as 	Anna-Greta
 Isa Quensel as Rosa
 Holger Löwenadler as 	Axel
 Einar Fagstad as 	Olle
 Eric Abrahamsson as 	Öl-Pelle
 Georg Rydeberg as 	Ture, insurance agent
 Nils Leander as 	Stranger

References

Bibliography 
 Krawc, Alfred. International Directory of Cinematographers, Set- and Costume Designers in Film: Denmark, Finland, Norway, Sweden (from the beginnings to 1984). Saur, 1986.
 Wredlund, Bertil & Lindfors, Rolf. Långfilm i Sverige: 1930-1939. Proprius, 1983.

External links 
 

1933 films
1933 drama films
Swedish drama films
1930s Swedish-language films
Swedish black-and-white films
Films directed by Oscar A. C. Lund
1930s Swedish films